

Crown
Head of State - Queen Elizabeth II

Federal government
Governor General - Ray Hnatyshyn

Cabinet
Prime Minister - Brian Mulroney
Deputy Prime Minister - Don Mazankowski
Minister of Finance - Michael Wilson then Don Mazankowski
Secretary of State for External Affairs - Joe Clark then Barbara McDougall
Minister of National Defence - Bill McKnight then Marcel Masse
Minister of National Health and Welfare - Perrin Beatty then Benoît Bouchard
Minister of Industry, Science and Technology - Benoît Bouchard then Michael Wilson
Minister of the Environment - Robert de Cotret then Jean Charest
Minister of Justice - Kim Campbell
Minister of Transport - Doug Lewis then Jean Corbeil
Minister of Communications - Marcel Masse then Perrin Beatty
Minister of Fisheries and Oceans - Bernard Valcourt then John Crosbie
Minister of Agriculture - Don Mazankowski then Bill McKnight
Minister of Public Works - Elmer MacKay
Minister of Employment and Immigration - Barbara McDougall then Bernard Valcourt
Minister of Energy, Mines and Resources - Jake Epp
Minister of Forestry - Frank Oberle
Minister of Veterans Affairs - Gerry Merrithew

Parliament
See: 34th Canadian parliament

Party leaders
Progressive Conservative Party of Canada -  Brian Mulroney
Liberal Party of Canada - Jean Chrétien
Bloc Québécois - Lucien Bouchard
New Democratic Party- Audrey McLaughlin
Reform Party of Canada - Preston Manning

Supreme Court justices
Chief Justice: Antonio Lamer
Beverley McLachlin
Bertha Wilson then Frank Iacobucci
William Stevenson
Gérard V. La Forest
John Sopinka
Peter deCarteret Cory
Claire L'Heureux-Dubé
Charles D. Gonthier

Other
Speaker of the House of Commons - John Allen Fraser
Governor of the Bank of Canada - John Crow
Chief of the Defence Staff - General John de Chastelain

Provinces and territories

Premiers
Premier of Alberta - Don Getty
Premier of British Columbia - Bill Vander Zalm then Rita Johnston then Michael Harcourt
Premier of Manitoba - Gary Filmon
Premier of New Brunswick - Frank McKenna
Premier of Newfoundland - Clyde Wells
Premier of Nova Scotia - Roger Bacon then Donald Cameron
Premier of Ontario - Bob Rae
Premier of Prince Edward Island - Joe Ghiz
Premier of Quebec - Robert Bourassa
Premier of Saskatchewan - Grant Devine then Roy Romanow
Premier of the Northwest Territories - Dennis Patterson then Nellie Cournoyea
Premier of Yukon - Tony Penikett

Lieutenant-governors
Lieutenant-Governor of Alberta - Helen Hunley then Gordon Towers
Lieutenant-Governor of British Columbia - David Lam 
Lieutenant-Governor of Manitoba - George Johnson
Lieutenant-Governor of New Brunswick - Gilbert Finn
Lieutenant-Governor of Newfoundland and Labrador - James Aloysius McGrath then Frederick Russell
Lieutenant-Governor of Nova Scotia - Lloyd Roseville Crouse
Lieutenant-Governor of Ontario - Lincoln Alexander then Hal Jackman
Lieutenant-Governor of Prince Edward Island - Marion Reid
Lieutenant-Governor of Quebec - Martial Asselin
Lieutenant-Governor of Saskatchewan - Sylvia Fedoruk

Mayors
Toronto - Art Eggleton, then June Rowlands
Montreal - Jean Doré
Vancouver - Gordon Campbell
Ottawa - James A. Durrell then Marc Laviolette then Jacquelin Holzman

Religious leaders
Roman Catholic Bishop of Quebec -  Archbishop Maurice Couture
Roman Catholic Bishop of Montreal -  Cardinal Archbishop Jean-Claude Turcotte
Roman Catholic Bishops of London - Bishop John Michael Sherlock
Moderator of the United Church of Canada - Walter H. Farquharson

See also
1990 Canadian incumbents
Events in Canada in 1991
1992 Canadian incumbents
Governmental leaders in 1991
 Canadian incumbents by year

1991
Incumbents
1991 in Canadian politics
Canadian leaders